Litoral Nordeste is a microregion in the Brazilian state of Rio Grande do Norte.

Municipalities 
The microregion consists of the following municipalities:
 Maxaranguape
 Pedra Grande
 Pureza
 Rio do Fogo
 São Miguel do Gostoso
 Taipu
 Touros

References

Microregions of Rio Grande do Norte